Yu Xiaohan is a retired badminton player from China. She won the 2015 Singapore Super Series with Ou Dongni. Yu was suspended for 7 months by BWF because one of her sample during 2015 Summer Universiade contained sibutramine. She announced her retirement through her personal social media Weibo on 13 October 2019, where before, she had given a resignation letter to the coach on 30 September 2019.

Achievements

BWF World Junior Championships 
Girls' doubles

Asian Junior Championships 
Girls' doubles

BWF World Tour 
The BWF World Tour, which was announced on 19 March 2017 and implemented in 2018, is a series of elite badminton tournaments sanctioned by the Badminton World Federation (BWF). The BWF World Tours are divided into levels of World Tour Finals, Super 1000, Super 750, Super 500, Super 300 (part of the HSBC World Tour), and the BWF Tour Super 100.

Women's doubles

BWF Superseries 
The BWF Superseries, which was launched on 14 December 2006 and implemented in 2007, is a series of elite badminton tournaments, sanctioned by the Badminton World Federation (BWF). BWF Superseries levels are Superseries and Superseries Premier. A season of Superseries consists of twelve tournaments around the world that have been introduced since 2011. Successful players are invited to the Superseries Finals, which are held at the end of each year.

Women's doubles

  BWF Superseries Finals tournament
  BWF Superseries Premier tournament
  BWF Superseries tournament

BWF Grand Prix (7 titles, 4 runners-up) 
The BWF Grand Prix had two levels, the BWF Grand Prix and Grand Prix Gold. It was a series of badminton tournaments sanctioned by the Badminton World Federation (BWF) which was held from 2007 to 2017.

Women's doubles

Mixed doubles

  BWF Grand Prix Gold tournament
  BWF Grand Prix tournament

BWF International Challenge/Series (2 titles, 1 runner-up) 
Women's doubles

Mixed doubles

  BWF International Challenge tournament
  BWF International Series tournament

References

External links 
 

1994 births
Living people
People from Huaibei
Badminton players from Anhui
Chinese female badminton players
Chinese sportspeople in doping cases
Doping cases in badminton
21st-century Chinese women